Katahari is the village development committee (VDC) of the Morang District, located in the Kosi Zone of southeastern Nepal. According to the 2011 Nepal census, it had a population of 39,975 inhabitants.

Geography 
Katahari is located in southeast Nepal in the Kosi Zone near Biratnagar (बिराटनगर). It has an area of 51.6 km².

References

Populated places in Morang District